The Birnie Symbol Stone is a class I Pictish stone, now situated on the north side of the graveyard of Birnie Kirk, in Moray, Scotland. It was discovered in c. 1850 within the wall of the graveyard, from where it was moved to its current location.

The stone is thought to date from the 7th century and is made of granite, standing 1.00m high, 0.64m wide and 0.51m deep. It carries an incised image of a bird above a notched rectangle and Z-rod.

References

Pictish stones